Montrol Rock is the largest of a group of rocks lying east of Cape Juncal, D'Urville Island, in the Joinville Island group of Antarctica. It was discovered by the French expedition under Captain Jules Dumont d'Urville, 1837–40, and named after François Mongin de Montrol, a French journalist and politician.

References

Rock formations of the Joinville Island group